Dharchula Dehat is a census town in Pithoragarh district in the state of Uttarakhand, India.

Geography

Demographics
 India census, Dharchula Dehat had a population of 3738. Males constitute 51% of the population and females 49%. Dharchula Dehat has an average literacy rate of 64%, higher than the national average of 59.5%: male literacy is 74% and, female literacy is 54%. In Dharchula Dehat, 17% of the population is under 6 years of age.

References

Cities and towns in Pithoragarh district